City of Kita Board of Education (北区教育委員会 Kita-ku Kyōiku Iinkai) is a city agency that operates public elementary and middle schools in Kita, Tokyo, Japan.

Schools

Junior high schools

Junior high schools include:
Akabane Iwabuchi Junior High School (赤羽岩淵中学校)
Asuka Junior High School (飛鳥中学校)
Horifune Junior High School (堀船中学校)
Inatsuke Junior High School (稲付中学校)
Jujo Fujimi Junior High School (十条富士見中学校)
Kamiya Junior High School (神谷中学校)
Kirigaoka Junior High School (桐ケ丘中学校)
Meio Junior High School (明桜中学校)
Ouji Sakura Junior High School (王子桜中学校)
 Its attendance boundary is:  (王子) 1-4 chōme and 5 chōme 1-4 ban,  (東十条) 1-4 chōme,  (王子本町) 1-chōme 1-18 and 21-30 ban,  1-chome, and  1-chome
Tabata Junior High School (田端中学校)
Takinogawa Koyo Junior High School (滝野川紅葉中学校)
Ukima Junior High School (浮間中学校)

Former junior high schools:
Akabane Junior High School (赤羽中学校)
Fujimi Junior High School (富士見中学校)
Iwabuchi Junior High School (立岩淵中学校)
Jujo Junior High School (十条中学校)
Koyo Junior High School (紅葉中学校)
Shinmachi Junior High School (新町中学校)
Takinogawa Junior High School (滝野川中学校)

Elementary schools

Elementary schools:
 No. 4 Iwabuchi Elementary School (第四岩淵小学校)
 Akabane Elementary School (赤羽小学校)
 Akabanedai Elementary School (赤羽台西小学校)
 Fukuro Elementary School (袋小学校)
 Hachiman Elementary School (八幡小学校)
 Higashi-Jujo Elementary School (東十条小学校)
 Horifune Elementary School (堀船小学校)
 Inada Elementary School (稲田小学校)
 Iwabuchi Elementary School (岩淵小学校)
 Jujo Elementary School (十条小学校)
 Kamiya Elementary School (神谷小学校)
 Kirigaokasato Elementary School (桐ケ丘郷小学校)
 Nadeshiko Elementary School (なでしこ小学校)
 Nishigahara Elementary School (西ケ原小学校)
 Nishigaoka Elementary School (西が丘小学校)
 Nishi Ukima Elementary School (西浮間小学校)
 Oji Elementary School (王子小学校)
 Its attendance boundary is: Ōji 2-4 chōme and 5-chōme 1-4 ban, and Higashi Jūjō 3-chōme 10-ban.
 Oji First Elementary School (王子第一小学校)
 Oji Second Elementary School (王子第二小学校)
 Oji Third Elementary School (王子第三小学校)
 Oji No. 5 Elementary School (王子第五小学校)
 Tabata Elementary School (田端小学校)
 Takinogawa Elementary School (滝野川小学校)
 Takinogawa No. 2 Elementary School (滝野川第二小学校)
 Takinogawa No. 3 Elementary School (滝野川第三小学校)
 Takinogawa No. 4 Elementary School (滝野川第四小学校)
 Takinogawa No. 5 Elementary School (滝野川第五小学校)
 Takinogawa Momiji Elementary School (滝野川もみじ小学校)
 Toshima Wakaba Elementary School (としま若葉小学校)
 Toyokawa Elementary School (豊川小学校)
 Ukima Elementary School (浮間小学校)
 Umenoki Elementary School (梅木小学校)
 Yabata Elementary School (谷端小学校)
 Yanagida Elementary School (柳田小学校)

 Former schools
 No. 3 Iwabuchi Elementary School (第三岩淵小学校)
 Akabanedai Nishi Elementary School (赤羽台西小学校)
 Arakawa Elementary School (荒川小学校)
 Jujodai Elementary School (十条台小学校)
 Momiji Elementary School (紅葉小学校)
 Takinogawa No. 1 Elementary School (滝野川第一小学校)
 Takinogawa No. 6 Elementary School (滝野川第六小学校)
 Takinogawa No. 7 Elementary School (滝野川第七小学校)

See also

References

External links
Junior high school list
Elementary school list

Kita, Tokyo
Education in Tokyo
Government of Tokyo
Municipal school systems in Japan